What's in a Name? (original title: Le Prénom, literally "The First Name") is a French-Belgian comedy film, written and directed by Alexandre de La Patellière and Matthieu Delaporte and released in 2012. It is adapted from the play Le Prénom by the same authors. The film was a box office success in France, selling 3,340,231 tickets.

Plot

Vincent, a real estate agent and father-to-be is invited for dinner by his sister Elisabeth and his brother-in-law Pierre. Their childhood friend, Claude (a trombonist for Radio France's orchestra), is also invited. Vincent is a wealthy, successful businessman, while Pierre, a university professor, is much more liberal. Elisabeth is a high school teacher for literature. Vincent's wife Anna is running late thanks to a business meeting.

While waiting for dinner to be served, Vincent decides to play a practical joke by pretending that his unborn son will be named Adolphe after the French literary hero. This causes a huge argument between Vincent and Pierre about whether this name can be appropriate considering its obvious connect to Hitler. Vincent tells Claude that this is a joke and Elisabeth is too busy preparing dinner to fully participate. This argument escalates and exposes a variety of old grievances and resentments between the four friends. Vincent is selfish, hypocritical and vain, with a humorous facial expression whenever he lies. Pierre is snobbish, miserly and condescending while Vincent finds the names of his children absurd. While Claude is mocked for his surname and his effeminate habits. Meanwhile, Elisabeth continues to be occupied by cooking and angry that the three men keep joking around without her. There is a lull in the argument until Anna arrives which reignites the conversation and exposes more rifts between all the characters.

Some huge revelations are brought to light after the meal is finished. Claude resents the questioning of his sexuality and reveals he has been seeing a women for a while now but refuses to divulge more information. Pierre confesses to having killed a family pet during their childhood when Vincent had taken the blame for it at the time. Meanwhile, Anna is frustrated that Vincent has not tried to learn more about her career despite her success. When pressed for more information about his mysterious partner, Claude eventually reveals that it is Vincent and Elisabeth's mother Francoise. In his shock, Vincent strikes Claude while everyone struggles to understand the revelation. After a brief pause, Elisabeth calls her mother and discovers the full truth of the matter. It is also revealed that Anna knew of this affair which further shocks everyone and raises the tension. In her frustration, Elisabeth confesses her long held resentments against her husband, brother and childhood friend. Vincent had always been the favorite child who was always forgiven. Claude had deeply betrayed her trust by not sharing his secret affair and she is furious with Pierre, having sacrificed her own academic career to support Pierre. In addition she feels as though he is not sharing their shared burden of parenthood and his hypocrisy is brought up once again. 

This leaves a quiet in the room as Anna and Elisabeth make their opinions clear. Anna is tired and disappointed with Vincent's childish and selfish behaviour, warning a divorce if he doesn't change his behaviour before accompanying Claude to see Francoise. Elisabeth tells Pierre that he will be in charge of cleaning up dinner, putting their children to bed and will be sleeping on the couch until further notice. This leaves Pierre and Vincent alone in the living room. They share a bottle of rose and joke around slightly to ease the tension still present.

4 months later, Pierre, Elisabeth, Claude and Francoise arrive to visit Vincent and Anna at the hospital to see their child, who is unexpectedly a daughter. Everyone is told that she will be named Francoise.

Cast 
 Patrick Bruel - Vincent
 Valérie Benguigui - Élisabeth
 Charles Berling - Pierre
 Guillaume de Tonquédec - Claude 
 Judith El Zein - Anna
 Françoise Fabian - Françoise

Awards

The film had five nominations at the 38th César Awards, winning in the categories Best Supporting Actress (Valérie Benguigui) and Best Supporting Actor (Guillaume de Tonquédec).

The movie has won two awards at film festivals in Canada: the Grand Prix Hydro-Québec at the Abitibi-Témiscamingue International Film Festival, and the Radio Canada Audience Award at the Cinéfranco International Francophone Film Festival in Toronto.

References

External links
 
 uniFrance Films
 Cinoche.com

2012 films
2012 comedy films
French comedy films
Belgian comedy films
2010s French-language films
French films based on plays
Films shot in Paris
Films featuring a Best Supporting Actress César Award-winning performance
Films featuring a Best Supporting Actor César Award-winning performance
French-language Belgian films
2010s French films